Zoe Wilson (born 15 February 1997) is an Ireland women's field hockey international. She was a member of the Ireland team that played in the 2018 Women's Hockey World Cup final. She was also a member of the Syracuse Orange field hockey team that won the 2015 NCAA Division I Field Hockey Championship. This was the first time a Syracuse Orange women's team won a national championship.

Early years, family and education
Wilson is the daughter of Debbie and Robert Wilson. She attended   Ballyclare High School and Syracuse University and is currently studying nutrition at Ulster University at Coleraine.

Club career

Ballyclare High School
Wilson, aged 14, scored the winning goal, a golden goal in extra time, for Ballyclare High School in the 2011–12 Ulster Senior Schoolgirls' Cup final as they defeated Lurgan College 2–1. A report in The News Letter declared "In the end, the result came down to a piece of sublime skill from Zoe Wilson who volleyed a chest high shot into the net, in the second period of extra-time." In October 2017 Wilson returned to Ballyclare as a volunteer coach.

Randalstown
Wilson began playing for Randalstown first-team when she was 15. On 26 December 2015, while on a break from Syracuse University, Wilson was a member of the Randalstown team that won the Ulster Shield. She also worked as an assistant coach with the team. In the final against Queen's University, Wilson scored a late equaliser. The game finished 2–2 before Randalstown eventually won 4–2 in a penalty shoot-out. After returning from Syracuse University permanently, Wilson continued to play for Randalstown during the second half of the 2015–16 season.

Syracuse Orange
In 2015 Wilson attended Syracuse University on a hockey scholarship. She subsequently helped Syracuse Orange win the 2015 NCAA Division I Field Hockey Championship. This was the first time a Syracuse Orange women's team won a national championship. In the final against North Carolina, Wilson scored the third goal in a 4–2 win. She was subsequently included in the NCAA All-Tournament Team Selection.

Harvestehuder THC
During the 2016–17 season, Wilson played for Harvestehuder THC in the Bundesliga.  Wilson scored on her debut for Harvestehuder in a 2–1 win over Berliner HC.

Belfast Harlequins
In 2017 Wilson began playing for Belfast Harlequins in the Women's Irish Hockey League. Her teammates at Harlequins included Lizzie Colvin and Jenny McAuley.
While playing for Harlequins, Wilson has also worked as a volunteer coach at both Ballyclare High School and for Armagh Hockey Club.

Ireland international
Wilson represented Ireland at Under-16, Under-18 and Under-21 levels before making her senior debut. In July 2015 Wilson captained the Ireland U-18 team that won the EuroHockey Youth Championships II. She scored in final as Ireland defeated Poland 7–0. Elena Tice was also a member of the team.

In January 2016 Wilson was included in a squad for a series of away friendlies against Spain. On 15 January 2016 she made her senior debut in the opening game of series, a 3–0 win for Spain. In the third game of the series, on 18 January, Wilson scored her first senior goal for Ireland. She scored a late winner, from a penalty corner, as Ireland came back from 2–0 down to win 3–2. In January 2017 she was also a member of the Ireland team that won a 2016–17 Women's FIH Hockey World League Round 2 tournament in Kuala Lumpur. She scored in the final as Ireland defeated Malaysia 3–0 in the final. Wilson won her 50th cap at the 2017 Women's EuroHockey Nations Championship.

Wilson represented Ireland at the 2018 Women's Hockey World Cup and was a member of the team that won the silver medal. She featured in all of Ireland's games throughout the tournament, including the pool games against the United States, India, and England, the quarter-final against India, the semi-final against Spain and the final against the Netherlands.

Honours
Ireland
Women's Hockey World Cup
Runners Up: 2018
Women's FIH Hockey World League
Winners: 2017 Kuala Lumpur
Women's FIH Hockey Series
Runners Up: 2019 Banbridge
Women's Four Nations Cup
Runners Up: 2017
EuroHockey Youth Championships II
Winners: 2015
Syracuse Orange
NCAA Division I Field Hockey Championship
Winners: 2015
Randalstown
Ulster Shield
Winners: 2015–16
Ballyclare High School
Ulster Senior Schoolgirls' Cup
Winners: 2011–12

References

External links
 

1997 births
Living people
Ireland international women's field hockey players
Female field hockey players from Northern Ireland
Irish female field hockey players
British female field hockey players
Irish field hockey coaches
Expatriate field hockey players
Belfast Harlequins field hockey players
Syracuse Orange field hockey players
Female field hockey defenders
Female field hockey midfielders
People educated at Ballyclare High School
Alumni of Ulster University
Sportspeople from County Antrim
Expatriate sportspeople from Northern Ireland in the United States
Expatriate sportspeople from Northern Ireland in Germany
Harvestehuder THC players
Women's Irish Hockey League players
Feldhockey Bundesliga (Women's field hockey) players